Yury Nesterov (born 29 July 1946) is a Soviet boxer. He competed in the men's heavyweight event at the 1972 Summer Olympics. At the 1972 Summer Olympics, he lost to Duane Bobick of the United States.

References

1946 births
Living people
Soviet male boxers
Olympic boxers of the Soviet Union
Boxers at the 1972 Summer Olympics
Place of birth missing (living people)
Heavyweight boxers